David James Stevens (born March 4, 1970) is an American former Major League Baseball pitcher who played for the Minnesota Twins (-), Chicago Cubs, Cleveland Indians, and Atlanta Braves.

External links
, or Retrosheet, or The Baseball Gauge, or Venezuela Winter League

1970 births
Living people
Atlanta Braves players
Baseball players from California
Brockton Rox players
Buffalo Bisons (minor league) players
Charlotte Knights players
Chicago Cubs players
Cleveland Indians players
Fort Worth Cats players
Fullerton College alumni
Fullerton Hornets baseball players
Geneva Cubs players
Greenville Braves players
Huntington Cubs players
Iowa Cubs players
Leones del Caracas players
Major League Baseball pitchers
Minnesota Twins players
Nashua Pride players
Navegantes del Magallanes players
American expatriate baseball players in Venezuela
Orlando Cubs players
Richmond Braves players
Salt Lake Buzz players
Sportspeople from Fullerton, California
Tacoma Rainiers players